Jonas Boesiger (born 5 April 1995) is a Swiss snowboarder. He competed at both the PyeongChang 2018 and Beijing 2022 Winter Olympics.

References

1995 births
Living people
Snowboarders at the 2018 Winter Olympics
Snowboarders at the 2022 Winter Olympics
Swiss male snowboarders
Olympic snowboarders of Switzerland
21st-century Swiss people